Hama Ekani Kalaayahtakai is a Maldivian romantic fantasy drama television series directed by Mohamed Manik. It stars Manik, Mariyam Azza, Sheela Najeeb and Aminath Rasheedha in main roles. The series follows the life of a cursed man who turns into a beast each full moon night and his journey to reformation with deceit and sacrifice.

Cast
 Mohamed Manik as Hassan Naail
 Mariyam Azza as Nadhuwa
 Sheela Najeeb as Shiyana
 Aminath Rasheedha as Naail's mother

Episodes

Soundtrack

Release and reception
The series was aired on 10 September 2008 on the occasion of 1429 Ramadan. The series mainly received mixed reviews from critics, where its uncanny similarities with Beauty and the Beast were particularly noted. The connectivity between the scenes were further criticized for its frequent change in character names between two scenes.

References

Serial drama television series
Maldivian television shows